Olga Fedorovich (born 28 October 1992) is a Belarusian draughts player, winner 2012 World Mind Sports Games in International draughts and was second in 2017 World Draughts Championship. She has become the champion of Belarus many times. Olga Fedorovich is a Women's International grandmaster (GMIF). Her sister Darja Fedorovich is also Belarusian draughts player.

World Championship
 2011 (4 place)
 2013 (5 place)
 2015 (4 place)
 2017 (2 place)
 2019 (6 place)
 2021 (6 place)

European Championship
 2012 (8 place)
 2014 (8 place)
 2016 (8-9 place)

Belarusian Championship
 2009 (1 place)
 2010 (2 place)
 2011 (1 place)
 2012 (2 place)
 2013 (2 place)
 2015 (1 place)
 2016 (2 place)
 2017 (2 place)

References

External links
 Profile, FMJD
 Profile, KNDB

1992 births
Living people
Players of international draughts
Belarusian draughts players